Tillandsia longifolia is a species of flowering plant in the genus Tillandsia. This species is native to Bolivia, Colombia, Peru, Panama, Costa Rica and Venezuela.

References

longifolia
Flora of Central America
Flora of South America
Plants described in 1889
Taxa named by John Gilbert Baker